Tameiki (Sigh) is Jun Shibata's second studio album and best-selling to date. It was released on February 26, 2003 and peaked at No. 12 in Japan.

Track listing
Yume (夢; Dream)
Tonari no heya (隣の部屋; The Room Next Door)
Kataomoi (片想い; One-Sided Love)
Circus~Piano Solo~ (サーカス～Piano Solo～; Circus)
Haikei, oujisama☆ (拝啓、王子様☆; Dear, Prince)
Gekkouyoku (月光浴; Moonlight Bath)
Utsukushii hito (美しい人; Beautiful Person)
Nani mo nai basho-Hikigatari- (なにもない場所－弾き語り－; Empty Place: Hikigatari) 1
Tameiki (ため息; Sigh)
Tsuki no mado (月の窓; Window of the Moon)
Mejiro no kokoro~Piano Solo~ (めじろの心～Piano Solo～; White-Eyed Heart: Piano Solo)

1Hikigatari means to sing to one's own accompaniment.

Charts

External links
http://www.shibatajun.com— Shibata Jun Official Website 

2003 albums
Jun Shibata albums